Pyar Kiye Jaa is a 1966 Indian Hindi-language romantic comedy film directed and produced by C. V. Sridhar. It stars Kishore Kumar, Shashi Kapoor, Mehmood, Kalpana, Rajasree, Mumtaz, Om Prakash. It was a "semi-hit" at the box office. The film is a remake of the Tamil comedy Kadhalikka Neramillai (1964), which was remade into Telugu as Preminchi Choodu in 1965. Actress Rajasree starred in all three versions of the film. Kadhalikka Neramillai was also later remade in Kannada as Preethi Madu Thamashe Nodu and in Marathi as Dhoom Dhadaka. The role played by Nagesh in the Tamil version was reprised by Mehmood in the Hindi version and by Dwarakish in the Kannada version.

Plot 
Widower Ramlal lives a wealthy lifestyle near Poona, India along with two daughters and a son. His daughter, Malti, is a Science graduate; Nirmala, a matriculate, and the son, Atma, who wants his father to finance a Hindi film, which he himself will produce under the banner of "Wah Wah Productions", he even signs up a nubile and sexy Meena Priyadarshini, the daughter of Ramlal's Estate Manager, to play the female lead role. Ramlal would like to get his daughters married to families that are wealthier than him. He hires an Assistant Manager, Ashok Verma, to look after his estate, but fires him when he finds out that he has misbehaved with his daughters. Ashok protests by putting up a tent in Ramlal's front-yard. Then Shyam friend of Ashok in disguise of elderly male comes to visit Ramlal, he identifies himself as Rai Bahadur Ganga Prasad, claims he is very wealthy, and the estranged father of Ashok. Ramlal seizes this opportunity and asks Rai Bahadur to get Ashok to marry one of his daughters. Ashok and his father reconcile, and Ashok decides to marry Nirmala. Then Ramlal gets another visitor, a wealthy elderly male by the name of Devraj, who knew Ramlal during his school-days. Ramlal and Devraj talk about old times, and end up fixing up the marriage of Malti with Devraj's son Shyam. Ramlal introduces Devraj to Rai Bahadur and starts preparations for both marriages – little knowing that soon he will find out that Devraj's son has gone missing, perhaps refusing to marry someone his father has chosen for him; Devraj learns that Ashok is actually the son of a poor schoolteacher and reveals to Ramlal that Rai Bahadur is a fraud, Ashok and Shyam are arrested by the police for cheating Ramlal, resulting a chaos, but finally all things and misunderstandings are cleared up and they live happily ever after.

Cast 
 Kishore Kumar as Shyam / Rai Bahadur Ganga Prasad
 Shashi Kapoor as Ashok Verma
 Mehmood as Atma
 Kalpana as Malti
 Rajasree as Nirmala
 Mumtaz as Meena Priyadarshini
 Om Prakash as Ramlal
 Chaman Puri as Devraj (Shyam's Father)
 Shivraj as Masterji (Ashok's Father)

Soundtrack 

All the songs were composed by Laxmikant-Pyarelal and lyrics were penned by Rajendra Krishan.

Production 
According to the book Eena meena deeka: the story of Hindi film comedy by Sanjit Narwekar, Pyar Kiye Jaa was a "frame-by-frame" remake of Sridhar's own Kadhalikka Neramillai.

Awards and nominations 
 Filmfare Best Comedian Award for Mehmood
 Filmfare Best Comedian Award – Nomination – Om Prakash

Mehmood won the Radhakrishan award for best comedian instituted by B R Chopra in honour of yesteryear actor Radhakrishan. Mehmood acknowledged that Om Prakash, who played his father in the film, equally deserved the award and his fabulous reactions made the scenes more entertaining.

References

External links 
 

1966 films
1960s Hindi-language films
Films directed by C. V. Sridhar
Films scored by Laxmikant–Pyarelal
Hindi remakes of Tamil films
Indian romantic comedy films
1966 romantic comedy films